Hawick Cottage Hospital was a health facility at Buccleuch Road in Hawick, Scotland. It was managed by NHS Borders. It is a Category B listed building.

History
The foundation stone for the hospital, which was designed by John McLachlan, was laid by the Earl of Mar and Kellie in August 1884. The hospital was opened in August 1885. The Minto Wing, which was financed by a gift from Violet Astor, was opened by the Prince of Wales in 1926. The hospital joined the National Health Service in 1948. After services transferred to the Hawick Community Hospital in 2005, Hawick Cottage Hospital closed and is now on the Buildings at Risk Register.

References

Hospitals in the Scottish Borders
1884 establishments in Scotland
Hospitals established in 1884
Hospital buildings completed in 1885
Defunct hospitals in Scotland